Mysore Gururao Vijayasarathi (11 December 1906 – 30 June 1979) was an Indian cricket umpire. He stood in 13 Test matches between 1951 and 1960. Vijayasarathi earlier played in eight first-class matches for Mysore.

His son, M. V. Nagendra, also umpired at Test level. The pair stood together in a first-class match between Mysore and Andhra during the 1960–61 season. Another son, M.V. Ravindra, played two Ranji Trophy matches for Madhya Pradesh

See also
 List of Test cricket umpires

References

1906 births
1979 deaths
Cricketers from Bangalore
Indian Test cricket umpires
Karnataka cricketers
Indian cricket umpires
Indian cricketers